Lê Xuân Hùng (born 14 November 1991) is a Vietnamese footballer who plays as a winger for V-League club Thanh Hóa

Honours

Club
Đông Á Thanh Hóa
Vietnamese National Cup:
 Third place : 2022

References 

1991 births
Living people
Vietnamese footballers
Association football wingers
V.League 1 players
Vietnamese expatriate footballers
Vietnamese expatriate sportspeople in Thailand
Expatriate footballers in Thailand
Vietnamese expatriate sportspeople in Laos
Expatriate footballers in Laos
Thanh Hóa FC players
Xuan Thanh Saigon Cement FC players
Haiphong FC players
People from Thanh Hóa province